Mikhail Yefimovich Fradkov (born 1 September 1950) is a Russian politician who served as Prime Minister of Russia from 2004 to 2007. An Independent, he was the longest serving director of Russia's Foreign Intelligence Service from 2007 to 2016. Since 4 January 2017, Fradkov has been Director of the Russian Institute for Strategic Studies.

The cabinet of Fradkov was the first government in the history of Russia that voluntarily resigned accordance to part 1 of Article 117 of the constitution.

Early life
Fradkov was born near Samara to a family of Jewish origin on his father's side. He studied at both the Moscow Machine Tool Design (станкоинструментальный) Institute (graduated 1972) and the Foreign Trade Academy (graduated 1981). In 1973, he was posted to the economic section of the Soviet Union's embassy in India, where he remained for two years. He later held several positions back in Russia. In 1991, he was Russia's representative to General Agreement on Tariffs and Trade (GATT) in Geneva.

Political career
In late 1992, Fradkov was appointed Deputy Minister for Foreign Economic Relations. Less than a year later, in October 1993, he became First Deputy Minister for Foreign Economic Relations. On 15 April 1997, a presidential decree by Boris Yeltsin appointed Fradkov Minister of Foreign Economic Relations and Trade, a post which he kept for nearly a year. In the middle of 1999, another presidential decree made him Minister of Trade. He was made director of the Federal Tax Police by Vladimir Putin in 2001, having previously been Deputy Secretary of the Security Council. In 2003 he was made Russia's representative to the European Union. On 1 March 2004, he was nominated by Putin as the next Prime Minister, and this appointment was approved by the Duma on 5 March.

Fradkov's nomination as Prime Minister was a surprise to many observers, as he was not seen as part of Vladimir Putin's inner circle. Some commentators, such as the Carnegie Moscow Center's Lilia Shevtsova, have speculated that his "outsider" status might have been an important factor in his nomination, saying that Putin selected him as someone who was "not a representative of any of the warring clans" in the Kremlin. Former Prime Minister Sergei Stepashin, whom Fradkov has served under, called Fradkov "absolutely independent from any sort of political clan or group." Putin and his allies praised Fradkov as experienced, professional, and honest.

On 12 May 2004, Fradkov was appointed Prime Minister for the second time, as Vladimir Putin had won the presidential election and been inaugurated on 7 May (see also Mikhail Fradkov's Second Cabinet). On 12 September 2007 Fradkov announced his resignation to President Putin, which Putin accepted, nominating Viktor Zubkov as Fradkov's successor. Putin bestowed an award on Fradkov and said that he would remain in office until the confirmation of a successor by the Duma. Zubkov was confirmed on 14 September 2007.

On 6 October 2007, President Putin announced that he would appoint Fradkov as head of the Foreign Intelligence Service.

Fradkov's appointment as head of the Foreign Intelligence Service, combined with his service in India, are suggestive of a KGB background. This calls into question earlier assumptions that he was an "outsider" in Kremlin circles and provides an explanation for Putin's trust in him.

In November 2010, reports emerged that one of Fradkov's intelligence officers, a Colonel Shcherbakov, had defected to the United States on 21 June 2010, having betrayed a Russian spy ring in the United States. Critics alleged that the suspicions that Shcherbakov was a double agent which emerged when Shcherbakov turned down a promotion requiring a lie detector test should have been followed up more aggressively. Shcherbakov also had a daughter in the United States. Kommersant, which broke the story, speculated that Fradkov might be replaced by Sergei Naryshkin and/or Russian intelligence services reorganized.

In April 2018, the United States imposed sanctions on him and 23 other Russian nationals. Pavel Fradkov, the son of Mikhail Fradkov, is a deputy head of the state property watchdog Rosimushchestvo.

Honours and awards
 Order of Merit for the Fatherland;
1st class (12 September 2007) – for outstanding contribution to the socio-economic policy
2nd class (1 September 2005) – for his great personal contribution to the state's economic policy, and many years of honest work
 Order of Honour
 Medal "In Commemoration of the 850th Anniversary of Moscow"
 Medal "For Valiant Labour. To commemorate the 100th anniversary of Lenin's birth"
 Fellow Russian counter-intelligence – the strengthening of ties between the Ministry of Foreign Economic Relations and the Federal Counterintelligence Service

References

External links

Biographies of the Fradkov Cabinet
Renaissance Capital Research Portal "The New Government"
 The Carnegie Moscow Center

1950 births
Living people
1st class Active State Councillors of the Russian Federation
Politicians from Samara, Russia
Jewish Russian politicians
Jewish prime ministers
Full Cavaliers of the Order "For Merit to the Fatherland"
Recipients of the Order of Honour (Russia)
Heads of government of the Russian Federation
Directors of the Foreign Intelligence Service (Russia)
21st-century Russian politicians
Russian individuals subject to the U.S. Department of the Treasury sanctions
Russian individuals subject to European Union sanctions
Fradkov family
20th-century Jews